Susefid (also Romanized as Sūsefīd) is a village in Hotkan Rural District, in the Central District of Zarand County, Kerman Province, Iran. At the 2006 census, its population was 22, in 10 families.

References 

Populated places in Zarand County